Robin Orr Blair, CVO, WS (born 1 January 1940), former Lord Lyon King of Arms of Scotland, is a retired solicitor, and was a partner with Dundas & Wilson CS and later with Turcan Connell. From 1988 until his appointment as Lord Lyon, he held the post of Purse Bearer to the Lord High Commissioner to the General Assembly of the Church of Scotland. He is a member of the Royal Company of Archers.

He was appointed Lord Lyon on 9 February 2001, the first to have been appointed in accordance with the European Union's rules for appointments to the public service and the first senior member of the Royal Household in Scotland to have been appointed by the Scottish Executive rather than Whitehall. He was appointed after the position was publicly advertised.

On 19 February 2007, he became the Honorary President of the Scottish Genealogy Society upon the retirement after many years of Sir Malcolm Innes of Edingight, who had preceded him as Lord Lyon.

In August 2007, Blair intimated his resignation as Lord Lyon. In 2008 his successor, David Sellar, was appointed.

Already a Lieutenant of the Royal Victorian Order (LVO), he was appointed Commander of the Royal Victorian Order (CVO) in the 2008 Birthday Honours.

Arms

See also
 Heraldry
 Officer of Arms
 The Court of the Lord Lyon King of Arms

References

External links
 Court of the Lord Lyon
 The Heraldry Society of Scotland

1940 births
Lord Lyon Kings of Arms
Living people
Scottish solicitors
Commanders of the Royal Victorian Order
Members of the Royal Company of Archers